Oleh Volodymyrovych Petrov (20 August 1960 – 20 January 2023) was a Ukrainian politician. A member of the People's Democratic Party, he served in the Verkhovna Rada from 1998 to 2006.

Petrov died in Kyiv on 20 January 2023, at the age of 62.

References

1960 births
2023 deaths
People's Democratic Party (Ukraine) politicians
Third convocation members of the Verkhovna Rada
Fourth convocation members of the Verkhovna Rada
Recipients of the Order of Merit (Ukraine), 2nd class
Recipients of the Order of Merit (Ukraine), 3rd class
Recipients of the Honorary Diploma of the Cabinet of Ministers of Ukraine
Oles Honchar Dnipro National University alumni
People from Pavlohrad